Wood is a lunar impact crater that lies entirely within the interior of the much larger walled plain Landau, on the far side of Moon. Wood is situated along the northwestern part of the floor of Landau, and shares a common northwestern rim with the larger impact. The inner wall of the northwest rim extends inward about halfway toward the crater midpoint, where there is a central peak. The rim of Wood is somewhat worn and uneven, with a small crater laid across the southwest section. The surviving interior floor is nearly level and is marked only by a few tiny craterlets.

Wood lies at the approximate margin of the Coulomb-Sarton Basin, a 530 km wide impact crater of Pre-Nectarian age.

Satellite craters
By convention these features are identified on lunar maps by placing the letter on the side of the crater midpoint that is closest to Wood.

Wood S is adjacent to Wood on the west side.  Wood T is a small crater northwest of Wood S, which has a bright ray system.

References

 
 
 
 
 
 
 
 
 

Impact craters on the Moon